Gebguda is a rural locality (a selo) in Khidibsky Selsoviet, Tlyaratinsky District, Republic of Dagestan, Russia. The population was 47 as of 2010.

Geography 
Gebguda is located 16 km north of Tlyarata (the district's administrative centre) by road. Khorta is the nearest rural locality.

References 

Rural localities in Tlyaratinsky District